Rasbora tuberculata is a species of ray-finned fish in the genus Rasbora. It is found in Indonesia and Malaysia.

References

Rasboras
Freshwater fish of Indonesia
Freshwater fish of Malaysia
Taxa named by Maurice Kottelat
Fish described in 1995